William Robert Wood (January 5, 1861 – March 7, 1933) was an American lawyer and politician who served as a U.S. Representative from Indiana from 1915 to 1933.

Biography 
Born in Oxford, Indiana, Wood attended the public schools of Oxford.  Then he went on to college and eventually graduated from the law department of the University of Michigan in 1882. He was admitted to the bar the same year and commenced practice in Lafayette in Tippecanoe County. He served as prosecuting attorney of Tippecanoe County 1890-1894.

Political career 
Wood served as member of the Indiana Senate 1896-1914, and served as president pro tempore 1899-1907. He served as Republican floor leader of the state Senate for four sessions.

Wood was a delegate to the Republican National Conventions in 1912, 1916, 1920, and 1924. He served as chairman of the Republican National Congressional Committee from 1920 to 1933.

Wood was elected as a Republican to the Sixty-fourth and to the eight succeeding Congresses (March 4, 1915 – March 3, 1933). He served as chairman of the Committee on Appropriations (Seventy-first Congress). He was an unsuccessful candidate for reelection in 1932 to the Seventy-third Congress.

Death 
Wood died while on a visit in New York City on March 7, 1933. He is interred in Spring Vale Cemetery, Lafayette, Indiana.

References

External links
 

1861 births
1933 deaths
Republican Party Indiana state senators
People from Benton County, Indiana
University of Michigan Law School alumni
Republican Party members of the United States House of Representatives from Indiana